Zhu Xiao-Mei (born 1949) is a Chinese French classical pianist and teacher, now based in Paris, France.

Biography
Zhu Xiao-Mei was born in Shanghai in 1949.  Her music studies started early, and she played on Beijing radio and television by the age of 8.  Two years later, she entered into the National School of Music for gifted children, and also attended the Central Conservatory of Music.  She currently teaches at Conservatoire Supérieur de Paris, living by the Seine in Paris, France. She maintains a low-key lifestyle and is one of the most talented and respected Chinese pianists of the century.

"1957-1975"  Early Years:  Cultural Revolution Survivor

Coming from an artistic family, she stepped onto the stage of Radio channels in Beijing to play piano at the age of 8. She graduated with excellent academic achievement from the high school affiliated with the Central Conservatory of Music in 1962. During the "Cultural Revolution" period, Zhu was dispatched to Zhangjiakou, Hebei Province for reeducation through a Maoist Labor Camp for 5 years. Despite this unfortunate experience, she kept her longing for art and for an ideal future alive and well during the years of this national chaotic madness. She even found a piano with broken strings on which she could practice in secret. She returned to Beijing in 1975. When China resumed the College Entrance Exam policy, Zhu's age only allowed her to be enrolled in the class of advanced studies at the Central Conservatory of Music. She then started to teach piano lessons at Beijing Dancing Academy.

"1979"  Master's Degree in Piano Music -The New England Conservatory of Music.

Her major life-changing event was when the famous American violinist Isaac Stern visited China in 1979, which eventually contributed to Zhu's study in the United States (also with the great help of prestigious pianist/educator Zhou Guang-Ren). She began to study at the New England Conservatory of Music in Boston in 1980, from which she received her Master's Degree in Piano Music.

During her years of study in the United States, she worked hard through part time jobs to support her study and it was a difficult time. She even did housecleaning for the principal female flutist of the Boston Symphony Orchestra in exchange for living and practicing piano at her home, which was a mutually beneficial relationship.

"1985"  Move to Paris, France

Just when she was losing hope in the States, Zhu got the chance to pursue her dream in Paris, France in 1985, just 2 days before her U.S. visa expired. At the beginning, she could barely make ends meet, but with the admiration and generous help of one professor in the Conservatoire Supérieur de Paris, she was offered a teaching position in the school and a budget accommodation in which to live. She had 7 different places where she could practice piano for free. With the help of friends, her stunning piano skills started to draw attention both from Europe and South America, leading to several music concerts & recitals in those areas.

"80s-90s"  Golden Years: the Big Takeoff

Without an agent's proper promotion, she still managed to make her impact in the classical music circle one step at a time, focusing her interest on a handful of composers of whom she was particularly fond. During her takeoff years playing piano in Paris, every single one of her recitals was sold out. Then she started to go on tours in Europe, North America, South America, Asia, and even Australia.

Her records/albums were great hits and have been admired by some major record companies since then. Mirare had published many of her records. Her interests include the Goldberg Variations, Domenico SCARLATTI, Joseph HAYDN, MOZART, BEETHOVEN, SCHUBERT and SCHUMANN, but it is BACH who remains at the heart of her music universe. And she is now widely recognized as one of his leading exponents. Of J.S. Bach's keyboard works, she has already recorded The Well-Tempered Clavier, the Partitas, The Art of the Fugue, the Inventions and Sinfonias and the Goldberg Variations. Her first album was completed at the age of 50.

One of the legendary stories is that when Zhu played the Goldberg Variations at a family concert in Paris, an old lady was so deeply impressed and touched by her way of interpreting BACH's music, that she offered a riverside apartment to Zhu at an extremely low price. The apartment was close to Musee du Louvre and Notre Dame de Paris with an amazing view of the River Seine. Visitors said there was almost nothing in Zhu's apartment except her piano and bed. She has lived a low profile and simple life all these years ever since she arrived in Paris.

"1994-2014" Highlights of her career

In 1994, Zhu was invited to perform a piano recital in Théatre de la Ville, which was also her first public performance as a pianist in Paris. Ever since then, her concerts have all sold out and until this day she keeps performing in Théatre de la Ville once a year.

Her first appearance in Théatre des Champs Elysées was a huge success.

Overexposure of herself is frowned upon by Zhu Xiao-Mei, as she only wants the audience to enjoy the pureness of her music rather than her life story. Unlike most artists that aim to get more opportunities by exposing themselves in front of cameras, she limits her public appearances as she only wants to perform for responsive audiences who love real classical music.

On June 21, 2014, Zhu was invited to perform in the St. Thomas Church, Leipzig, where J.S BACH had worked for 23 years. The recital was held just in front of BACH's grave , Zhu was the first pianist to perform in this church, "The concert started at 10:30pm and ended at 1:30am. It was a special musical experience." Zhu said, who played BACH's music for almost all her life. The DVD and CD of this recital have received a Special Achievement Award at the International Classical Music Awards.

Documentary

The peace and quietness, and real balance that she finds in Bach's music is actually the highest level of traditional Chinese philosophy and wisdom – Taoism, the concept of which is explained in a more detailed manner in her documentary "Une Chinoise avec Bach", directed by Michel Mollard. The short film briefly tells the story of Zhu Xiao-Mei's life -long passion with J.S BACH and is a very beautiful artwork indeed.

Recent Updates

She performed in China for the first time in 2014, after an absence of 35 years, While she received the title of Professor Emeritus at the Beijing Conservatory, the same year she was honored with the title of "Chevalier of Ordre des Arts et des Lettres" by The Ministry of Culture, France .

She currently has two major projects in hand: First her recording of BACH's keyboard works and second, her help for a younger generation of musicians. Her own generation having known not only a loss of liberty accompanied by material hardship but also what she regards as the worst of all privations: the closure of schools and universities and the actual denial of an education.

Her autobiography, The Secret Piano: From Mao's Labor Camps to BACH's Goldberg Variations was published by Robert Laffont in 2007 and won the 2008 Grand Prix des Muses. It has been translated into many other languages.

Fan Page

Facebook Fan Page:  search page "Zhu Xiao-Mei"

References

website (as of Sept. 16. 2022): https://www.zhuxiaomei.com/

References

1949 births
Living people
Chinese classical pianists
Chinese women pianists
Piano pedagogues
Central Conservatory of Music alumni
New England Conservatory alumni
Academic staff of the Conservatoire de Paris
Chinese emigrants to the United States
Chinese emigrants to France
Sent-down youths
Musicians from Shanghai
Musicians from Paris